Said Sulub Mohamed is a Somali politician, who is currently serving as the Minister of Livestock and Fisheries of Somaliland. He also served as the Minister of Public Works and Housing.

See also

 Ministry of Livestock & Fisheries (Somaliland)
 Politics of Somaliland
 List of Somaliland politicians

References

|-

Peace, Unity, and Development Party politicians
Living people
Government ministers of Somaliland
Year of birth missing (living people)